Alan William Hyland (born July 28, 1945) is a municipal and provincial level politician from Alberta, Canada. He served as a member of the Legislative Assembly of Alberta from 1975 to 1993.

Political career
Hyland ran as a candidate for the Progressive Conservatives in the 1975 Alberta general election. He ran in the Cypress electoral district, that was previously held by former Premier Harry Strom. Hyland won the district, picking it up for his party by winning a closely contested election defeating Social Credit candidate Barry Bernhardt and two other candidates.  He was re-elected with a larger majority in the 1979 Alberta general election winning well over 50% of the popular vote. Hyland ran for a third term in office in the 1982 Alberta general election. He secured the largest majority of his political career with the only opposition coming from Independent candidate Orville Reber.

The Cypress electoral district was abolished in 1986 due to redistribution. Hyland ran in the new electoral district of Cypress-Redcliff for the 1986 general election and won a close race over Lloyd Robinson running under the Representative Party banner. Robinson and Hyland would face each other again in the 1989 general election. Hyland would defeat Robinson by 600 votes, who increased his popular support running under the Liberal banner. Hyland retired at dissolution of the Assembly in 1993.

After leaving provincial politics, Hyland became mayor of Bow Island, Alberta.

References

External links
Legislative Assembly of Alberta Members Listing

|-

Progressive Conservative Association of Alberta MLAs
Living people
Mayors of places in Alberta
1945 births